{{Speciesbox
|image = Delosperma napiforme ex. Juliano Ruivo white flower.jpg
|genus = Delosperma
|species = napiforme
|authority = (N.E.Br.) Schwantes<ref name=CoL> {{Catalogue of Life | id= 6CHHG|option=taxon |title=Delosperma napiforme (N. E. Br.) Schwantes |access-date=9 March 2022}}</ref>
}}Delosperma napiforme (also known as Mestoklema macrorrhizum'') is a dwarf perennial plant, native to the French Island of Réunion, but also now found in Madagascar. It has white flowers

Cultivation and uses
It can be cultivated in a wide range of areas with a Mediterranean climate such as California. It can withstand wet summers and cold moist winters which makes it unusual in climatic requirements for this genus.

References

napiforme
Entheogens
Taxa named by N. E. Brown